"Run Runaway" is a song by the British rock band Slade, released in 1984 as the third single from the band's eleventh studio album The Amazing Kamikaze Syndrome, and the lead single from the album's US counterpart Keep Your Hands Off My Power Supply. The song was written by lead vocalist Noddy Holder and bassist Jim Lea, and produced by John Punter. It reached No. 7 in the UK and was also the band's breakthrough hit in the United States, where it reached No. 20.

Background
Having recorded much of The Amazing Kamikaze Syndrome in 1982, Slade's label RCA felt the album lacked chart potential and in the effort to amend that, RCA suggested the band work with producer John Punter. Holder and Lea then wrote and demoed two songs; "My Oh My" and "Run Runaway". Both were received with enthusiasm by RCA and Punter was hired to work on the two tracks. With the UK/European success of "My Oh My" in late 1983, The Amazing Kamikaze Syndrome was rush-released by RCA in December. In January 1984, "Run Runaway" was released as the album's third single, which reached No. 7 in the UK and was a hit across Europe and beyond too.

The 1983 success of Quiet Riot's version of Slade's 1973 UK chart topper "Cum On Feel the Noize" led to Slade signing with CBS for their first American record deal since the 1970s. The label soon repackaged The Amazing Kamikaze Syndrome into Keep Your Hands Off My Power Supply and released "Run Runaway" as the lead single in March 1984. With surging interest in the band and a music video benefiting from heavy play on MTV, "Run Runaway" was Slade's breakthrough hit in the United States and would remain the band's biggest success there. It peaked at No. 20 on the Billboard Hot 100 and was also No. 1 on the Billboard Top Tracks Chart.

"Run Runaway", described by Holder as "a rocky Scottish jig", features Lea on electric fiddle. In a 1984 interview, Holder said: "We always wanted to do a jig with the old violin going and that. We decided to go in and put a sort of rock beat behind an old Scottish jig." In a 1986 fan club interview, Lea revealed that he had come up with the song's melody while holding a conversation with someone. The song bears melodic and structural similarities to the 19th century hymn "There Is a Happy Land".

Release
"Run Runaway" was released on 7" and 12" vinyl by RCA Records in the UK, Ireland, across Europe, Australia, New Zealand and Japan. It was released by CBS in the United States and Canada. The B-side on all RCA versions of the single was "Two Track Stereo, One Track Mind", which was exclusive to the single and would later appear on the band's 2007 compilation B-Sides. On the CBS releases, "Don't Tame a Hurricane" appeared as the B-side, which would be included as an album track on Keep Your Hands Off My Power Supply. The 12" vinyl, released in the UK and Germany, featured an extended version of "Run Runaway" as the A-side.

Promotion

In the UK, the band performed the song on the TV music show Top of the Pops, while performances were filmed at the Hall of Fame and Rhyl Sun Centre. The band also performed the song at the 1984 Montreux Festival and on German and Swedish TV. In America, the song was performed on American Bandstand and The Dance Show.

A music video was filmed to promote the single, which was directed by Tim Pope for GLO Productions. It was shot at Eastnor Castle in Ledbury, Herefordshire. The video featured the band performing the song in front of an audience dressed in tartan. Other sequences showed a marching bagpipe band and a kilted Scot grappling with a caber. The video was a big success in America, where it received constant showing on MTV.

Critical reception
In a review of The Amazing Kamikaze Syndrome, Record Mirror chose the song as their favourite track from the album, describing it as having a "stately pulse" and with single potential. Sounds commented the song "shows them cheekily and triumphantly plagiarising flavour-of-'84 Big Country". In a retrospective song review by AllMusic, Dave Thompson described the song as "storming" and wrote: "Building on the anthemic power of the earlier "My Oh My", "Run Runaway" is raucous chanting, swirling guitars, wild violin, and even a taste of heavy metal bagpipes, helped along by a drum sound that is pure early '80s."

Formats
7" Single (RCA release)
"Run Runaway" - 3:43
"Two Track Stereo, One Track Mind" - 2:54

7" Single (CBS release)
"Run Runaway" - 3:43
"Don't Tame a Hurricane" - 2:33

7" Single (CBS promo)
"Run Runaway" - 3:43
"Run Runaway" - 3:43

12" Single (UK/German release)
"Run Runaway" - 5:26
"Two Track Stereo, One Track Mind" - 2:52

12" Single (CBS promo)
"Run Runaway" - 4:59
"My Oh My" - 4:11

Chart performance

Weekly charts

Year-end charts

Cover versions
 In 1986, Czech singer Petra Janů released a Czech-language cover version titled "My Chceme gól" (We want goal), with new, association football-themed lyrics. 
 In 1990, Eurodance group Dominoo released an EP with four different versions of the song.
 In 1993, Polish band Acid Drinkers recorded a cover on their album Fishdick.
 In 1995, Canadian band Great Big Sea recorded a cover of the song on their album Up.
 Also in 1995, Canadian band Captain Tractor used the melody and chorus in their song Lord of the Dance on their album East of Edson.
 In 2001, Bart Foley recorded a version of the song for the compilation Slade Remade: A Tribute to Slade.
 In 2001, Off Kilter released a version of the song on their album Etched in Stone.
 In 2007, Swedish techno-country group Rednex recorded a cover of the song.
 In 2007, Celtic rock band Prydein recorded a cover of the song on their album Loud Pipes.

Personnel 
Slade
Noddy Holder - lead vocals, rhythm guitar
Jim Lea - electric violin, bass, backing vocals, producer of "Two Track Stereo, One Track Mind" and "Don't Tame a Hurricane"
Dave Hill - lead guitar, backing vocals
Don Powell - drums

Additional personnel
John Punter - producer of "Run Runaway"
Mike Nocito, Pete Schwier - engineers on "Run Runaway"
Shoot That Tiger! - design
Andrew Christian - art direction

See also
List of Billboard Mainstream Rock number-one songs of the 1980s

References

1984 singles
1984 songs
Slade songs
Great Big Sea songs
Songs written by Noddy Holder
Songs written by Jim Lea
Song recordings produced by John Punter
Music videos directed by Andrew MacNaughtan
RCA Records singles